Douglas County School District Re. 1 is a school district that serves Douglas County, Colorado. The district was formed in 1958 by the consolidation of 17 smaller school districts, adding the "Re. 1" to its name to note the district's first reorganization.

In August 2019, the Arapahoe Community College Sturm Collaboration Campus at Castle Rock, Colorado has opened. This is a partnership with the district and Colorado State University. Classes at the new 43,000-square-foot facility at 4500 Limelight Ave. begins Aug. 19. Initial educational offerings will be in the areas of business and entrepreneurship, health care, cybersecurity and secure software, information technology/programming, general education and workforce training.

Schools

Castle Rock area
Academy Charter School
American Academy Castle Pines
Aspen View Academy
Cantril Preschool
Castle Rock Elementary School
Castle Rock Middle School
Castle View High School
Cherry Valley Elementary School
Clear Sky Elementary School
Daniel C. Oakes High School
Douglas County High School
Early Childhood Center South
eDCSD
Flagstone Elementary School
Larkspur Elementary School
Meadow View Elementary School
Mesa Middle School
Renaissance Elementary Magnet School
Renaissance Secondary
Rock Ridge Elementary School
Sage Canyon Elementary School
Sedalia Elementary School
Soaring Hawk Elementary School
South Ridge Elementary School
World Compass Academy

Highlands Ranch area
Acres Green Elementary School
Arrowwood Elementary School
Ascent Classical Academy
Bear Canyon Elementary School
Ben Franklin Academy
Buffalo Ridge Elementary School
Copper Mesa Elementary School
Cougar Run Elementary School
Coyote Creek Elementary School
Cresthill Middle School
DCS Montessori
Eagle Academy
Eagle Ridge Elementary School
Eldorado Elementary School
Fox Creek Elementary School
Heritage Elementary School
Highlands Ranch High School
Lone Tree Elementary School
Mountain Ridge Middle School
Mountain Vista High School
Northridge Elementary School
Platte River Academy
Plum Creek Academy
Ranch View Middle School
Redstone Elementary School
Rock Canyon High School
Rocky Heights Middle School
Roxborough Primary
Roxborough Primary and Intermediate School
Saddle Ranch Elementary School
Sand Creek Elementary School
SkyView Academy
STEM School Highlands Ranch
Stone Mountain Elementary School
Summit View Elementary School
ThunderRidge High School
Timber Trail Elementary School
Trailblazer Elementary School
Wildcat Mountain Elementary School

Parker Area
American Academy Lincoln Meadows
American Academy Parker
Challenge To Excellence
Chaparral High School
Cherokee Trail Elementary School
Cimarron Middle School
Franktown Elementary School
Frontier Valley Elementary School
Global Village Academy
Gold Rush Elementary School
Iron Horse Elementary School
Legacy Point Elementary School
Legend High School
Leman Academy of Excellence
Mammoth Heights Elementary School
Mountain View Elementary School
North Star Academy
Northeast Elementary School
Parker Core Knowledge
Parker Performing Arts School
Pine Grove Elementary School
Pine Lane Elementary School
Pioneer Elementary School
Ponderosa High School
Prairie Crossing Elementary School
Sagewood Middle School
Sierra Middle School

High schools
Castle View High School
Chaparral High School
Douglas County High School
Highlands Ranch High School
Legend High School
Mountain Vista High School
Ponderosa High School
Rock Canyon High School
ThunderRidge High School

Charter schools
Ascent Classical Academy (K-12)
Academy Charter School (K-8)
American Academy (K-8)
Aspen View Academy (K-8)
Challenge to Excellence Charter School (K-8)
Core Knowledge Charter School (K-8)
Colorado Early Colleges (CEC) Castle Rock
Colorado Early Colleges (CEC) Inverness
Colorado Early Colleges (CEC) Parker 
DCS Montessori Charter School (P-8)
North Star Academy (K-8)
Platte River Academy (K-8)
Plum Creek Academy
 SkyView Academy (K-12) Highlands Ranch
 STEM School Highlands Ranch (K-12)

Option schools
Daniel C. Oakes High School
DC Student Support Center
Eagle Academy – Night High School (11–12 Grades)
eDCSD: Online Learning (K-12)
Expert Technician Academy
Hope Online Learning Academy (K-12)
Lone Tree Elementary... A Magnet School (Elem. #49)
Renaissance Expeditionary Magnet (K-6)
Rocky Mountain School of Expeditionary Learning (K-12)

See also
 Endrew F. v. Douglas County School Dist. RE–1
List of school districts in Colorado

References

External links

School districts in Colorado
Education in Douglas County, Colorado
School districts established in 1958
1958 establishments in Colorado